Sugarpills is the title of an extended play by the New Zealand band, Kids of 88. It was released on 14 February 2011.

Track listing
 "Sha-Maraca" – 1:28
 "Sugarpills" – 3:08
 "Nerves" – 3:17
 "Universe" – 3:25
 "Home" – 4:36

References

2011 EPs
Pop music EPs
Kids of 88 albums